Dieter Tetzlaff (born 13 January 1944) is a former international speedway rider from East Germany.

Speedway career 
Tetzlaff was a five times champion of East Germany, winning the East German Championship on five occasions in 1974, 1976, 1978, 1979 and 1980.

References 

Living people
1944 births
German speedway riders